Sam Maes  (born 7 June 1998) is a Belgian alpine skier. 
He competed in giant slalom at the 2018 Winter Olympics.

World Cup results

Season standings

Results per discipline

 standings through 7 February 2021

World Championship results

Olympic results

Other results

European Cup results

Season standings

Results per discipline

Standings through 7 February 2021

References

External links

1998 births
Living people
Belgian male alpine skiers
Olympic alpine skiers of Belgium
Alpine skiers at the 2018 Winter Olympics
Alpine skiers at the 2022 Winter Olympics
Alpine skiers at the 2016 Winter Youth Olympics
People from Edegem
Sportspeople from Antwerp Province